Shestikurganny is a rural locality (a khutor) in Oktyabrvskoye Rural Settlement, Bobrovsky District, Voronezh Oblast, Russia. The population was 158 as of 2010.

Geography 
Shestikurganny is located 37 km east of Bobrov (the district's administrative centre) by road. Nikolskoye is the nearest rural locality.

References 

Rural localities in Bobrovsky District